Fabrice Jeandesboz (born 4 December 1984) is a French former road and track cyclist, who competed professionally between 2009 and 2017 for the  and  teams.

Jeandesboz joined  for the 2014 season, after his previous team –  – folded at the end of the 2013 season. He was named in the start list for the 2015 Vuelta a España.

Major results

2004
 3rd Paris–Mantes-en-Yvelines
 8th Chrono Champenois
2005
 1st  Individual pursuit, National Under-23 Track Championships
 3rd Overall Critérium des Espoirs
2007
 2nd Overall Tour de Gironde
2010
 1st Prologue (TTT) Tour Alsace
 6th Classic Loire Atlantique
 7th Overall Tour de l'Ain
2011
 5th Overall Vuelta a Burgos
 7th Overall Vuelta a Murcia
 8th Overall Tour Méditerranéen
 9th Les Boucles du Sud-Ardèche
2012
 4th Overall Tour du Gévaudan Languedoc-Roussillon
 7th Klasika Primavera
 8th Overall Tour Méditerranéen
2013
 5th Les Boucles du Sud-Ardèche
 8th Overall Vuelta a Castilla y León
 10th Overall Route du Sud
2014
 6th Overall La Tropicale Amissa Bongo
2015
 2nd Overall Rhône-Alpes Isère Tour
1st Stage 3
 2nd Polynormande
 6th Overall Tour de l'Ain

Grand Tour general classification results timeline

References

External links

Fabrice Jeandesboz profile at Saur-Sojasun

1984 births
Living people
French male cyclists
People from Loudéac
Sportspeople from Côtes-d'Armor
Cyclists from Brittany